Jeanne Marie Louise Barbillion (12 October 1895 – 8 August 1992) was a French pianist, violinist, and composer.

Life 
Born in Paris, Barbillion attended the Schola Cantorum de Paris from the age of 8. She was a pupil of Vincent d'Indy (who nicknamed her "the Chameleon") who gave her orchestration lessons,  and Berthe Duranton.

In the late 1910s, she performed as a violinist with Vincent d'Indy in pieces by Nicola Porpora, Franz Schubert and Vincent d'Indy.

In the 1920s, she created the Barbillion Quartet, in collaboration with Denise Vidaillet, Edwige Bergeron, Madeleine Portier, and Marcel Vernet. She composed and created several of her works for her quartet, (La tristesse de Pan, 13 March 1926) for example).

In 1972, she took part in a day in homage to Charles Fourier, for whom she composed a Hymne sylvestre for mixed choir and mezzo-soprano, Scènes champêtres for piano four hands, and En forêt for piano four hands.

In 1939 she was awarded the title of Officier of the Ordre des Palmes académiques.

Barbillon died in Paris at the age of 96.

Work 
 1926. Provence. Deux pièces, for piano (éd. Maurice-Senart)
 1926. Sonate en ré majeur, for violin and piano (éd. Maurice-Senart). In concert at la Salle des agriculteurs in June 1925. at the September 1925 Salon d'automne and in concert on radio in June 1927.
 1928. Trio, for piano, violin and cello (éd. Fortin)
 1930. Sonate synthétique, for cello and piano (éditions Fortin, 1934)
 1936. Quatuor à cordes, for two violins, viola and cello
 1972. Hymne sylvestre, for mixed choir and mezzo-soprano. Score available at la-colonie.org
 1972. Scènes champêtres, 6 pieces for children (« Sur la route », « Aux champs », « Le ruisseau », « À la ferme », « L’orage », « Le retour »), for piano four hands
 1972. En forêt (« Jeux », « Soir », « Départ matinal », « Sieste »), for piano four hands.

 Aurora, for male choir
 Automne, for voice and piano
 Chorale et pastorale en rondeau, for ondes Martenot, organ and strings
 Cortège funèbre, for English horn and string orchestra
 Dédicace, for soprano, women's choir and piano
 Two symphonic movements for orchestra
 Étude symphonique for orchestra
 Dorian Hymn, for viola and chromatic harp
 Ile de France, for flute and piano
 Impression maritime, for piano (published by Fortin, 1930)
 Jeanne d'Arc à Rouen, for soloists, choir and orchestra
 Cadence for Beethoven's Violin Concerto
 Pan's Sadness, for baritone, flute, harp and (?)
 The Erinnyes, for soprano, tenor and orchestra
 The Flies, for women's choir
 La noce, nocturne, for voice and piano. In concert at the TSF, 26 June 1927
 Poème d'été, for flute, oboe, cello, bassoon and piano
 Poème, for cello and piano
 Provence, for piano
 Quatuor avec piano, for violin, viola, cello and piano
 Quintette à vent
 Sonate, for piano
 Trio avec piano, fo violoi, cello and piano. Prix Marmontel, 1928.
 Variations sur des vieux Noëls, pour quatuor à cordes et orgue. Premiered 25 December 1935 by Maurice Duruflé

Recording 
 1923. Quatuor nº2, (Vincent d'Indy) by the Barbillion quartet. Gramophone W 507 à 509.

Video 
 2020. Sonate, for violin and piano, by Francis Paraïso.

References 

20th-century French women classical violinists
20th-century French composers
French women composers
1895 births
1992 deaths
Musicians from Paris